Theodore Rodolf (October 17, 1814February 12, 1892) was a Swiss American immigrant, Democratic politician, and Wisconsin pioneer.  He was the 10th and 12th mayor of La Crosse, Wisconsin, and represented La Crosse for two terms in the Wisconsin State Assembly.

Biography
Rodolf was born on October 17, 1814, in Switzerland. He graduated from the University of Zurich before moving to Lafayette County, Wisconsin, in 1834. He died in La Crosse on February 12, 1892 after an illness lasting more than a year.

His brother, Charles Rodolf, was a member of the Assembly and of the Wisconsin State Senate.

Career
While living in Mineral Point, Wisconsin, he served as Village President in 1851 and 1852.  He was appointed Receiver of Public Moneys at La Crosse by President Franklin Pierce in 1853, and served in that role until 1861.

Rodolf was elected to the Assembly running on the Democratic Party ticket in 1867. The next year, rather than running for re-election, he was a candidate for the United States House of Representatives from Wisconsin's 6th congressional district.  He lost to incumbent Cadwallader C. Washburn, but went on to win back his seat in the Assembly in the 1869 election.  During the same time, he was elected mayor of La Crosse in the 1868 and 1870 Spring elections.

References

External links

Swiss emigrants to the United States
People from Lafayette County, Wisconsin
People from Mineral Point, Wisconsin
Democratic Party members of the Wisconsin State Assembly
Mayors of La Crosse, Wisconsin
University of Zurich alumni
1814 births
1892 deaths
People from La Crosse, Wisconsin
19th-century American politicians